Love's Coming is a 2014 LGBT Thai film, starring Suttinut Uengtrakul and Norrapat Sakulsong. The movie's director is Naphat Chaithiangthum. The film was filmed in 2013 and was released on 27 February 2014.

On 13 December 2014, it was revealed that a sequel was in production, Love's Coming 2, but the title was later changed to Love Love You, and was released in 2015.

Plot
The story reveals a strong friendship between four teenage boys: Pid, Arm, Zee and Gump. Zee asks Gump to hangout several times, but the latter says he has a prior commitment with his neighbor Nai every time, whom he is helping with studying. Zee and the others try several times to find out if their friend is in love or not with the help of Uncle Lek who likes to be called Aunt Alexandra.

Cast

References

2014 films
Thai LGBT-related films